"Down City Streets" is a song written by Australian singer songwriter Ruby Hunter and recorded by her husband Archie Roach. The song was released in 1991 as the second single from Roach's debut studio album Charcoal Lane (1990).

"Down City Streets" is an autobiographical song Hunter wrote recalling her time as a homeless alcoholic. She gave the song to her husband Roach to record for his debut studio album. In 2015 Roach recalls the scenario coming home one night "... she was there and she screwed up this paper and tried to hide it under the pillow or something like that and I said, 'What is that?' She said, 'Ah, nothing'. I said, 'Can I have a look at it?' She reluctantly gave me this piece of paper with a song written on it ... and she just sat down and sang it to me."

At the ARIA Music Awards of 1992, the song was nominated for ARIA Award for Best Indigenous Release.

The song was re-recorded by Roach and Hunter on the album Ruby in 2005.

Track listing

Release history

References 

Australian songs
Archie Roach songs
Mushroom Records singles
1990 songs
1991 singles
Songs about Australia
Songs about poverty